Pride of the Blue Grass may refer to:

 Pride of the Blue Grass (1939 film), an American film directed by William C. McGann 
 Pride of the Blue Grass (1954 film), an American film directed by William Beaudine